There were elections in 1943 to the United States House of Representatives:

 
1943
United States home front during World War II